The Joe M. Beutell House in Thomasville, Georgia was built in 1930.  It is notable for its Tudor Revival architecture and was listed on the National Register of Historic Places in 1991.

It was built by and for contractor Joe M. Beutell and was designed by architect Russell L. Beutell (1891-1943).

It was later the home of Judge Reason C. Bell while he was chief justice of the Georgia Supreme Court.

References

External links
 

Houses on the National Register of Historic Places in Georgia (U.S. state)
Tudor Revival architecture in the United States
Houses completed in 1930
Houses in Thomas County, Georgia
National Register of Historic Places in Thomas County, Georgia